Matt Simpson (born 29 August 1981) is a British racing driver most recently seen competing in the British Touring Car Championship. He debuted in 2016, after being double champion in the Quaife Intermarque Championship in 2013 and 2014.

Racing career
Simpson began his career in National Hot Rod in 2005, before graduating to the National Hot Rod European Series in 2006. He also raced in the National Hot Rod World Series that year. He went on to win the European series two times in 2009 and 2011, as well as finishing runner-up in the World series in 2008 and 2009. In 2013 he switched to the Quaife Intermarque Championship, winning back-to-back titles in 2013 and 2014. In November 2015, it was announced that Simpson would make his British Touring Car Championship debut with Speedworks Motorsport driving a Honda Civic Type R.

Racing record

Complete British Touring Car Championship results

(key) (Races in bold indicate pole position – 1 point awarded just in first race; races in italics indicate fastest lap – 1 point awarded all races; * signifies that driver led race for at least one lap – 1 point given all races)

References

External links
 
 
 

1981 births
Living people
British Touring Car Championship drivers
English racing drivers
British racing drivers